Gerard Brantsen (10 January 1735 in Arnhem – 21 December 1809 in Arnhem) was a Dutch politician and diplomat. He was one of the Dutch signatories to the treaty ending the Fourth Anglo-Dutch War in 1784. He was also mayor of Arnhem in 1762 and 1765, and several times an alderman of this city. He was a member of the Staatsbewind of the Batavian Republic between 16 October 1801 and 29 April 1805 (president between 1 May 1804 and 31 July 1804).

Personal life
Brantsen was born the son of Johan Brantsen and Hester Henrietta de Vree. His father was receiver-general of the Veluwe quarter of Gelderland. Both his grandfathers were burgemeesters of Arnhem.

Brantsen studied law at Leiden University where he received his law degree on 10 September 1755 with a dissertation entitled De mutuis inter diversas atque vicinas gentes officiorum humanitatis atque comitatispraestationibus.

He remained unmarried but fathered two sons

Career

Brantsen started his political career on 6 May 1760 when he was co-opted in the Arnhem vroedschap. He remained a member until 25 January 1788. He was several times a schepen of the city, and also a burgemeester. In 1764 he was for the first time sent to the regional council for the Veluwe Quarter, representing Arnhem. On 8 June 1764 he was made a member of the Gelderland delegation in the States General of the Dutch Republic, which he remained until 1782.

On 15 August 1782 he was sent by the States-General to the peace negotiations between the participants in the American Revolutionary War in Fontainebleau as an Envoy Extraordinary and Minister Plenipotentiary (together with ambassador Mattheus Lestevenon) for the Republic to negotiate the 1784 treaty that ended the Fourth Anglo-Dutch War (to which he was a signatory). While in France they negotiated the Treaty of Fontainebleau (1785) with Holy Roman Emperor Joseph II which maintained the continued closure of the Scheldt, in exchange for certain concessions from the Republic. In 1787 he was recalled, but remained as a private citizen in France until 1792 (Rue Neuve des Mathurins). In 1794 he acted ( together with Ocker Repelaer van Driel) as envoy to the French Republic to attempt to conclude a separate peace in the War of the First Coalition between the Dutch and French Republics, but the collapse of the Dutch defense prevented this from coming to fruition.

After the Batavian Revolution of 1795 he remained a private citizen again until he was elected a member of the new Staatsbewind of the Batavian Republic in October 1801. He was a member of the commission for the Interior of the Staatsbewind, and between 1 May and 31 July 1804 President of the Staatsbewind.

In May 1805 (after the Staatsbewind had been replaced by Grand Pensionary Rutger Jan Schimmelpenninck) he was again appointed envoy extraordinary to France where he helped negotiate the transfer of the Batavian Republic to the Kingdom of Holland. He was Grand Master of Ceremonies for king Louis from 4 July 1806, which he remained until January 1808. He was Grand Master and chamberlain extraordinary of the king from September 1808 until 21 December 1809.

In July 1804 Brantsen was made Grand Aigle of the Legion of Honour by emperor Napoleon I. He received the Grandcross of the Order of the Union on 16 February 1807 from king Louis.

Brantsen died on 21 December 1809 in his birthplace Arnhem. He was buried in the Grote Kerk in Arnhem on 27 December 1809

Notes and references

Notes

References

Sources
Aa, A.J. van der, Brantsen (Mr. G.), in: Biographisch Woordenboek der Nederlanden, deel 2, derde en vierde stuk (Haarlem 1855) pp. 1199-1200 
Mr. G. Brantsen, Parlement & Politiek 
Koene, B., Schijngestalten. De levens van diplomaat en rokkenjager Gerard Brantsen (1735-1809) (Hilversum 2013)  
Rosenstein, Brantsen (Mr. Gerard), in Molhuysen, P.C., P.J. Blok, and L. Knappert, Nieuw Nederlandsch Biografisch Woordenboek(NNBW) Deel 7 (Leiden 1927), p. 195 

1734 births
1809 deaths
Aldermen in Gelderland
18th-century Dutch diplomats
Mayors of Arnhem